John Sherburne may refer to:
 John Sherburne (pioneer) (1615–1693), emigrant from England to New England
 John Samuel Sherburne (1757–1830), U.S. representative from New Hampshire
 John C. Sherburne (1883–1959), Vermont attorney and judge

See also
 John Sherburne Sleeper (1794–1878), American sailor, writer and politician